Iliyan Avramov Stefanov (born 20 September 1998) is a Bulgarian professional footballer who plays as an attacking midfielder for Levski Sofia and the Bulgarian national team.

Club career
Stefanov started to play football at Levski Sofia. In the end of 2015 he moved to Italy to join Avellino's youth academy. Between 2016 and 2017 he played 7 games for Gozzano in Serie D.

In 2017, Stefanov returned to Bulgaria to sign for Lokomotiv Sofia. He established himself as an undisputed starter and a top performer for the club in the Second League. His talent attracted the attention of various teams from the Bulgarian top flight and on 23 February 2021, he signed with Beroe.

On 1 March 2022, Stefanov signed with his boyhood club Levski Sofia on a 2-year deal. Оn 15 May 2022, he scored the only goal in the Bulgarian Cup final, leading his club to its first trophy since 2009.

International career
After making his first appearance for the senior side in the 1–1 home draw with North Macedonia on 2 June 2022, Stefanov scored his first goal for Bulgaria in his second cap in a 2–5 defeat to Georgia on 5 June 2022.

Career statistics

International

Scores and results list Bulgaria's goal tally first.

Honours
Levski Sofia
 Bulgarian Cup: 2021–22

References

External links
 

Living people
1998 births
Bulgarian footballers
Association football midfielders
FC Lokomotiv 1929 Sofia players
PFC Beroe Stara Zagora players
PFC Levski Sofia players